Go West Young Man, Let the Evil Go East is the third album by the American metalcore band Greeley Estates, released on May 6, 2008. The first single released from the album was "Blue Morning".

The album is the first by Greeley Estates without their previous post-hardcore sound and pursues more of the heavier metalcore musical style.

Track listing

Personnel
Greeley Estates
 Ryan Zimmerman - lead vocals
 Alex Torres - lead guitar
 Brian "B-Champ" Champ - drums, percussion
 Brandon Hackeson - rhythm guitar, backing vocals

Additional musicians
 Tyler Smith - bass guitar, vocals (on tracks 2, 5, 6, 8, 10, 11, 12 and 13)
 Joshua "Fergz" Ferguson - vocals, bass guitar (on tracks 1, 3, 4, 7 and 9)
 Cameron Martin (of The Irish Front) - vocals (on tracks 1, 4, 9 and 13)
 Dan Parker - vocals (on tracks 1, 5 and 12)
 Joe Cotella (of The Cover Up) - vocals (on track 8 and 12)
 Graham Orthmann (of Emerald Honor) - vocals (on tracks 1, 4 and 12)
 Aaron Harris (of Emerald Honor) - vocals (on tracks 1, 4 and 12)
 Amy Cooper - vocals (on tracks 3, 5 and 11)

Additional personnel
 All music written and arranged by Greeley Estates
 Greeley Estates Music LLC (BMI)/Science Records
 Recorded, programmed, engineered and mixed by Cory Spotts
 Produced by Cory Spotts and Greeley Estates
 Additional programming and engineering by David Ludlow
 Recorded at Bluelight Audio, Phoenix, Arizona
 Mastered by U.E. Nastasi at Sterling Sound
 Drum tech: Marty Welker
 Management: Stewart and Judi Teggart (Tightenitup Entertainment)
 Legal representative: Lisa Socransky
 A&R: Paul Gomez, Ryan Whalley, and Stewart Teggart
 Art direction/layout: Corey Meyers
 Photos by Joey Lawrence
 Characters by Oliver Polanski

References 

2008 albums
Greeley Estates albums